Sir James Smith's School is a coeducational secondary school located in the town of Camelford, North Cornwall, England. The headteacher is Kristien Carrington.

History
Founded as a grammar school in 1679, at a property overlooking the town, the school has been state run since 1962 when it moved to Dark Lane. It was the first purpose-built comprehensive school in Cornwall. Until July 1962 it was Sir James Smith's Grammar School at College Road and no secondary modern school existed for the district. The new school at Dark Lane was designed by the county architect, F. K. Hicklin, and Kenneth Sprayson continued to be headmaster. (The school building at College Road was built about 1879 and extended twice before being vacated and used as offices for the rural district council.)

Previously a foundation school administered by Cornwall Council, in October 2018 Sir James Smith's School converted to academy status. The school is now sponsored by the North Cornwall Learning Trust.

Geography
The catchment area for Sir James Smith's is largely rural and covers an extensive and sparsely populated district of north Cornwall, stretching along the coast from Crackington Haven to Boscastle, Tintagel, and Port Isaac. Inland  Delabole, St Teath and St Breward and the isolated hamlets and farmsteads of Bodmin Moor are included. This area is one of the most economically deprived in Europe. Available employment is frequently part-time and/or seasonal and the average wage is the lowest in the UK; whereas property and living costs are among the highest.

21st century
The school had 543 pupils aged 11–16 (as of 2011). It is one of the smallest state secondary schools in the UK. For comparison, neighbouring secondary schools have between 1200 - 2100 pupils aged 11–16 and 200+ sixth formers.

The last decade has seen an extension to the adult education building; the Salon United for careers in hair and beauty therapy (2007); the West End music and drama suite (2004); a new reception and office suite (2003); a new Mathematics block (2001) and The Princess of Wales Design Centre (Arts and Technology) (1992). The school however abolished the hair salon extension, which has subsequently become the offices for Camelford police, a part of Devon and Cornwall Police.

In 2005 Sir James Smith's School became the first specialist humanities college in Cornwall.

In October 2007 it was announced that the school's Sixth Form block would be closing with immediate effect. No new students were to be admitted in the following September. The news was greeted with grave concern among many teachers, students, parents and locals. Year 12 were permitted to finish their studies at the school.  Students continuing their education now travel to other Sixth Form centres at Wadebridge, Bude, Bodmin or Truro College.

Since 2010, pupil numbers have steadily declined (417 pupils as of April 2016)  as parents have chosen large schools in the local area leading to rumours of the school's potential closure.

School day
The school is different from the majority of schools in the region and the UK, as it finishes early. However, the school day includes five one-hour lessons:
8:20-8:40 Tutorial/Year Assembly
8:40-9:40 First Lesson
9:40-10:40 Second Lesson
10:40-11:00 Break Time
11:00-12:00 Third Lesson
12:00-13:00 Fourth Lesson
13:00-13:30 Lunch Time
13:30-14:30 Fifth Lesson
14:30 End of school day, or After school clubs until 15:45

Uniform 
The school uniform was changed in 2011 and now consists of:
 Black V-neck jumper (with the school emblem—a red camel—embroidered on the top left)
 Red tie (small camels are pictured on the tie)
 Black jumpers/cardigans for Year 11s to signify that they are the senior pupils
 Black skirt
 Tailored shorts (summer only)
 White shirt
 Black or white socks
 Black trousers; black skirt for girls
 Black shoes

Until the change in colours the school uniform included a bottle green sweatshirt (with the school emblem, a red camel, embroidered on the top left of it). Earlier uniforms also used the school colours of green and red and the camel emblem.

In 2001 a protest by students, requesting that shorts to be added to the uniform, resulted in many being locked out of the school. As of 2009, shorts have been added to the uniform. In 2007, a redesigned physical education kit was introduced, consisting of a blue shirt with a black horizontal band.

Deme system 
In 2004 the deme system was introduced: Deme being a Latin term for a house or group. The first elements of the names are derived from common place-name elements in Cornish: chy (house), tre (farmstead), pol (pool), and lan (originally an enclosure, but in placenames usually combined with the name of a saint to refer to a church). The demes are equivalent to the house system followed by many neighbouring schools. (A division into Drake House (green) and Wallis House (red) was in existence at one time in the grammar school; then Bottreaux, Carew, Grenville and Molesworth houses in the comprehensive school.) An in-school competition followed to name them: those selected were all from the Cornish language, with deme added to the end.

 Chydeme - blue
 Tredeme - orange
 Poldeme - purple
 Landeme - yellow

Although the school had a 'vertical' tutoring system for a number of years, where forms consisted of a single deme and students from years 7 - 11), it has since reverted to the more traditional year group form system.

Magazine
The pupils produced a school magazine in the 1950s and 1960s called The Camel: the issues for 1957-1962 are numbered Vol. I, no. VI - XI and 1964 is not numbered.

Notable former pupils
Trevor Colman - UKIP MEP for South West England. (2008–14)
Derek Pooley - chief executive, United Kingdom Atomic Energy Authority, 1994-97 
Jenny Rowe - civil servant and chief executive of the new Supreme Court of the United Kingdom.
Tom Jago, liquor executive and marketeer
Sheila Oates Williams, mathematician in Australia

References

External links

 Official website
 2006 Sir James Smith's School results on BBC Education

Secondary schools in Cornwall
Academies in Cornwall
Camelford
1679 establishments in England
Comprehensive schools in England